The 2014–15 Prva A liga is the 9th season of the Prva A liga, Serbia's premier Water polo league.

Team information 

The following 12 clubs compete in the Prva A liga during the 2014–15 season:

{| bgcolor="#f7f8ff" cellpadding="3" cellspacing="0" border="1" style="font-size: 95%; border: gray solid 1px; border-collapse: collapse;text-align:center;"
|-
|style="background: #7fff00;" width="20" |
| bgcolor="#ffffff" align="left" | Teams from  Adriatic Water Polo League|}

 Regular season 
 Standings 

Pld - Played; W - Won; D - Drawn; L - Lost; GF - Goals for; GA - Goals against; Diff - Difference; Pts - Points.

 Schedule and results 

 Championship playoff 
Teams in bold won the playoff series. Numbers to the left of each team indicate the team's original playoff seeding. Numbers to the right indicate the score of each playoff game.

 Final 
 1st leg

 2nd leg

 3rd legPartizan Rajfajzen won Championship final series 3–0.''

References

External links 
 Serbian Water Polo Federaration 

Seasons in Serbian water polo competitions
Serbia
Prva A liga
Prva A liga
2014 in water polo
2015 in water polo